Enrique Beckles (born 5 August 1927) is an Argentine sprinter. He competed in the men's 100 metres at the 1952 Summer Olympics.

References

External links
 

1927 births
Living people
Athletes (track and field) at the 1952 Summer Olympics
Athletes (track and field) at the 1951 Pan American Games
Athletes (track and field) at the 1955 Pan American Games
Argentine male sprinters
Olympic athletes of Argentina
Athletes from Buenos Aires
Pan American Games competitors for Argentina
20th-century Argentine people